The Motion Picture and Television Photo Archive (MPTV) is an archive collection of celebrity and entertainment photography founded by photographer and director Sid Avery. It currently contains over a million images by over 60 noted photographers, and is one of the largest such archives in the world. MPTV licenses this material for publication, and offers prints for sale.

References

External links 
 Motion Picture and Television Photo Archive Website

Photographic collections and books
Archives in the United States